Keshavarz Football Club is a defunct Iranian football club that was based in Tehran, Iran. It was owned by the Ministry of Agriculture.

Managers
Fereydoun Asgarzadeh (1992–1993)
Hans-Jürgen Gede (1993–1994)
Sirous Ghayeghran (1994–1996)
Amir Ghalenoei

References

Defunct football clubs in Iran
Sport in Tehran